= Uusi Lahti =

Newspaper published in Lahti, Finland

- Type: Newspaper
- Format: Tabloid
- Editor-in-chief: Tommi Berg
- Language: Finnish
- Circulation: 52,000 (2016)
- ISSN: 0358-8483
- Website: Uusi Lahti

Uusi Lahti is a free newspaper published in Lahti, Finland, and distributed throughout Lahti and its surrounding communities. It is delivered on Wednesdays and Saturdays. The current editor-in-chief, Tommi Berg, succeeded Kari Naskinen in 2008. In 2014, Uusi Lahti was recognized as Finland’s best city magazine.
